Eucereon archias is a moth of the subfamily Arctiinae. It was described by Stoll in 1790. It is found in Suriname.

References

archias
Moths described in 1790